SK Horácká Slavia Třebíč is an ice hockey team in Třebíč, Czech Republic. They play in the Czech 1.liga, the second level of ice hockey in the country. The club was created in 1928.
Some notable NHL players were born in Třebíč and started their hockey career in this club: Patrik Eliáš, Martin Erat and Vladimír Sobotka.

Achievements
Czech 2.liga champion: 1995, 1996, 1997

References

External links
Official site

Ice hockey teams in the Czech Republic
Ice hockey clubs established in 1928
Třebíč